The 2009–10 Egyptian Handball League was the 54th edition of the Egyptian Handball League, which Zamalek crowned For the second time in a row.

League System

The 2009–10 Egyptian Handball League system of The league is divided into three phases, the first phase is a combined cycle of 12 teams, they play two roles, the first 6 ascend according to the order of the second phase, the second phase is a round of one round, the teams are arranged through it and the first team gets six points and the second 5 points and so on and they qualify for the last phase They play a round of one turn and the one with the most points is crowned.

The First Stage

The First Final Stage

The Final Stage

After the end of the final stage, Zamalek was declared the winner of the Egyptian Handball League.

Cairo Derby
First Match of The First Stage
Friday 4 December 2009

Second Match of The First Stage
Friday 19 March 2010

First Match of The Final Stage
Saturday 1 May 2010

Second Match of The Final Stage
Wednesday 12 May 2010

References

Handball in Egypt